The Crip Walk, also known as the C-Walk, is a dance move that was created in the 1970s by first generation Crip member Robert "Sugar Bear" Jackson, and has since spread worldwide.

Overview
The dance is primarily an act of performing quick and intricate footwork.
The rivalry between the Crips and the Bloods spilled over into the world of entertainment, with the adoption of the gang dance by various rappers on the West Coast of the United States, who gave it its name, the Crip Walk. This dance involves the movement of one's feet, classically to the spelling of C-R-I-P (refer C Walk). It was used by Crips at parties to display affiliation, particularly vis-a-vis rival gang the Bloods. It was also used after killing someone to give the kill a Crip signature. MTV declined to broadcast any music videos that contained the Crip Walk.

Examples
Tennis player Serena Williams performed the walk at the 2012 Summer Olympic tennis tournament after defeating Maria Sharapova in the gold-medal match at Centre Court, Wimbledon.
The Super Bowl LVI halftime show had a synchronized Crip Walk led by Snoop Dogg.

Variations
There are many variations of the standard Crip Walk, including the Modern Crip Walk, Clown Walk Killwaukee Walk and Crown Walk. The chief differences are in the way moves are executed, from elements such as speed, energy, flow, variations, arm control, and bounce.

Documentaries
American rapper CJ Mac released a documentary focused on the beginnings of Crip Walk and its rise in popularity entitled "Cwalk: It's a Way of Livin'". It features such rappers as Snoop Dogg, WC and Ice-T along with original members of the Crips.

See also
Gangsta Walking

References

Further reading

Crips
Street dance
West Coast hip hop
Hip hop dance
Dance moves